The Kasimov war was a conflict between two organized crime groups in Kasimov for the illegal distribution of stolen gold.

The war
In 1989 the decision was made to build a gold processing plant in Kasimov, which was called "Prioksky Non-Ferrous Metals Plant". It was distinguished from similar enterprises in Novosibirsk, Krasnoyarsk and Shchelkovo not only by large volumes of production, but also by a powerful security system - a whole battalion of internal troops was engaged in security. In 1991, the plant produced the first gold smelting. After this event, some local criminal groups realized they could create a business through the theft and resale of gold, the two most powerful criminal groups, one led by Vitaly Kurbatov and the other by Andrej Efremov (the latter colluded with the soldiers to steal gold) clashed to conquer this deal, disappearances and the discovery of corpses with signs of torture began to take place, even some shootings took place. In 1994, a turning point occurred in the investigation, two individuals in possession of a one-kilogram gold bar were arrested and their confessions revealed that they had previously sold another 22 kilograms of gold stolen by the industry. In 1997 Andrei Efremov was killed with a gunshot to the head and in the same year numerous arrests were made after numerous investigations that brought to light collusion between criminal groups and the military in charge of overseeing the industry. A total of 126 bandits and 55 militaries were arrested, including 14 controllers of the Internal Troops of Russia, for having stolen more than 400 kg of gold, Vitaly Kurbatov was also arrested who received a life sentence for theft of gold and dozens of murders.

References

Conflicts in 1992
Conflicts in 1997
Organized crime conflicts
 
Mafia